Catapterix crimaea is a moth of the family Acanthopteroctetidae, found in Ukraine on the Crimean peninsula. It is the type species of the genus Catapterix.

From its description in 1988 until the description of Catapterix tianshanica in 2016, it was considered the sole species of Catapterix.

References

Moths described in 1988
Moths of Europe
Acanthoctesia
Taxa named by Aleksei Konstantinovich Zagulyaev